A destructive outbreak sequence triggered 13 tornadoes from Nebraska to Virginia. The most and strongest tornadic activity, as well as most of the casualties, including all the deaths, came on June 27, when a catastrophic early-morning F4 tornado killed five and injured 100 in Kansas while two F3 tornadoes caused a combined 50 injuries and one fatality in Illinois later that afternoon. Overall, the outbreak sequence killed six, injured 161, and caused $10.283 million in damage.

Meteorological synopsis
A low-pressure system formed over southern British Columbia on June 23 and moved southeastward into Montana. Storm fronts coming from this system and another one out of California began to fully form into thunderstorms, heavy rain and hail over Nebraska and Minnesota on June 25. By late on June 26, a weak warm front became draped over the Central Plains stretching from southeastern Colorado northeastward through Kansas to northern Missouri. This became the focal point for two early morning tornadoes in central part of Kansas, including a violent and deadly F4 tornado in Wakeeney. Meanwhile, a low-pressure system formed over southern Minnesota on June 24 while another one formed over northeastern Illinois northwest of Chicago on June 26. These systems moved eastward across the Great Lakes and Northeastern United States producing multiple rounds of severe weather here and in the Mid-Atlantic.

Confirmed tornadoes

June 25 event

June 26 event

June 27 event

Non-tornadic effects
Lightning damaged or destroyed multiple buildings near Long Prairie, Minnesota during the morning hours of June 25. That afternoon, lightning killed one and injured two others in Greenwood County, Kansas. Straight-line winds, hail, heavy rain, flooding caused damage in Colorado, Minnesota, Iowa, Nebraska, the Carolinas, Tennessee and Georgia, notably Atlanta. Hail also injured two and killed livestock in Sedgwick, Colorado. Lightning caused damage in Bredenton, Tennessee and Nemaha County, Kansas early on June 26. Severe thunderstorms and lightning caused more damage that afternoon from Georgia to Virginia. One person was injured by lightning in Sampson County, North Carolina near Clinton while two other people were killed in Sumter, South Carolina. In Georgia, one person was killed by lightning in Union City and injured another person in Hapeville. Severe storms covered large sections of the Eastern United States and the Great Lakes on June 27. Severe winds, hail, lightning, and flooding killed three and injured 17.

See Also
 List of North American tornadoes and tornado outbreaks
 List of F4 and EF4 tornadoes

Notes

References

Tornadoes of 1951
F4 tornadoes
Tornadoes in Minnesota
Tornadoes in Nebraska
Tornadoes in Iowa
Tornadoes in Colorado
Tornadoes in West Virginia
Tornadoes in Michigan
Tornadoes in Kansas
Tornadoes in Ohio
Tornadoes in Virginia
Tornadoes in Illinois
Tornadoes in Pennsylvania